Abakaliki is the capital city of Ebonyi State in southeastern Nigeria, located  southeast of Enugu. The inhabitants are primarily members of the Igbo nation. It was the headquarters of the Ogoja province before the creation of the Southeastern State in 1967.

Etymology
The name Abakaliki originally means 'Aba Nkaleke' and is the name of a community in Izzi land (Nkaleke).

History
Abakaliki was an important center for the slave trade in the 17th century. The slave trade continued in the area with Aro raids into Abakaliki and surrounding areas through the 18th century.

The Odozi Obodo Society was a secret cult that operated between 1954 and 1958 in Abakaliki.

Economy
Abakaliki, as in the past, is a center of agricultural trade including such products as yams, cassava, rice, and both palm oil and palm kernels,. It is also known for its local lead, zinc, salt, and limestone mining or quarrying. They host a golf course and many hotels. There are also isolated poultry and egg production farms across the state.

Population
The last known population of Abakaliki was 915,438(year 2019). This was 0.253% of total Nigerian population. If population growth rate would be same as in period 2006–2015 (+15.31%/year), it is estimated that the population of Abakaliki as at 2021 is about 1,179,280.

Demographics
Abakaliki is generally populated by the Igbo people. Abakaliki is predominantly populated by the Northeastern Igbo of the Afikpo-Abakaliki axis. Abakaliki is also use to refer to people of old Abakaliki political block comprising Ohaukwu-Ishielu-Izzi-Ezza-Ikwo.

Infrastructure 
Abakaliki lies at the intersection of the Enugu, Afikpo and Ogoja Roads. Abakaliki also hosts a Federal hospital, which has largely contributed to the affordability of public healthcare delivery in the city and the state. There has been massive infrastructural developments ongoing in the urban center; these include road construction, shopping malls and market places, trans-Sahara fly-over bridges at presco and spera-in-deo junctions amongst others.

Education
Ebonyi State University main campus is located on the outskirts of the city.

Religion
Abakaliki people like other southeastern Nigerians are predominantly Christians. Other religious faith like Traditionalist, Islam, etc. are practiced by handful of the natives as well as non-natives from other parts of the country. Roman Catholic, Presbyterian, Anglican and other Pentecostal missions are the dominant Christian faiths. On March 1, 1973, the city was made the seat of the Roman Catholic Diocese of Abakaliki.

Footnotes

References
 
 
 

State capitals in Nigeria
Cities in Ebonyi State
Local Government Areas in Ebonyi State
Local Government Areas in Igboland